Itziar Gastearena Artola (born 4 May 1993) is a Spanish footballer who plays as a defender for Alavés.

Club career
Gaste started her career at Tolosa. She played for Real Sociedad for seven seasons – making nearly 200 appearances for the Txuri-urdin and recovering from a serious anterior cruciate ligament injury to her right knee sustained in 2016.

In 2018 she signed for Eibar, moving between the Gipuzkoan clubs along with three teammates. A year later – along with goalkeeper Cris Cornejo, another of the group who had switched to Eibar – Gaste moved on to Alavés, of the same level, and was a regular member of the team as they won the Segunda División Pro title and gained promotion to the Primera in the 2020–21 season.

References

External links
Profile at La Liga

1993 births
Living people
Women's association football defenders
Spanish women's footballers
People from Tolosaldea
Sportspeople from Gipuzkoa
Footballers from the Basque Country (autonomous community)
Real Sociedad (women) players
SD Eibar Femenino players
Deportivo Alavés Gloriosas players
Primera División (women) players
Segunda Federación (women) players
Primera Federación (women) players
Granada CF (women) players